CWLB may refer to the:

 Canada Worker Lockdown Benefit
 Communist Workers League of Britain (Marxist–Leninist)